Pichacani  (possibly from Aymara pichaqa, phichaqa, piqacha a big needle, -ni a suffix to indicate ownership, "the one with a big needle") is a mountain in the Vilcanota mountain range in the Andes of Peru, about  high. It is located in the Cusco Region, Canchis Province, Pitumarca District. Pichacani lies between the mountain Comercocha in the west and the lake Sibinacocha in the east.

References

Mountains of Cusco Region
Mountains of Peru